Hotel Albert may refer to:

In the United States

 Hotel Albert (New York, New York), listed on the National Register of Historic Places (NRHP) in Manhattan
 Hotel Albert Commercial Block, Walterboro, South Carolina, listed on the NRHP in Colleton County
 Hotel Albert (Salt Lake City, Utah), listed on the NRHP in Salt Lake City, Utah